The Union Trust Company Building is a historic building at 170 Westminster Street and 62 Dorrance Street in downtown Providence, Rhode Island.

History 
It is a twelve-story steel-framed structure, faced in brick and stone. Originally four bays deep, it was expanded to seven bays in 1920. It was designed by Stone, Carpenter & Willson and built in 1901–02 to house the offices of the Union Trust Company, which occupied the first two floors and leased the remaining space. The exterior of the first two floors is treated differently than the upper floors, with a tall first floor whose windows are separated by stone pilasters, and heavily quoined corners. The second floor windows are set within round-arch openings with elaborate keystones. The upper levels are finished predominantly in brick, with marble trim; the third story receives a somewhat more elaborate treatment. The interior banking hall (on the first floor) was noted for its particularly sumptuous decoration.

The building was listed on the National Register of Historic Places in 1973.

In 2016, a New York developer signed a contract for $2.5 million in state historic preservation tax credits. The developer plans to "convert the building to a mix of business and restaurant on the first two floors and rooftop, and apartment use on all other floors."

Gallery

See also
 National Register of Historic Places listings in Providence, Rhode Island

References

Commercial buildings completed in 1901
Buildings and structures in Providence, Rhode Island
Bank buildings on the National Register of Historic Places in Rhode Island
National Register of Historic Places in Providence, Rhode Island
Historic district contributing properties in Rhode Island